Fåhraeus, Fåhræus, or Fahraeus is a Swedish surname.  It can refer to:

  (b. 1965), Swedish inventor
  (1828-1867), Swedish statistician
  (1817-1900), Swedish politician
  (1862-1936), Swedish priest
  (b. 1973), Swedish game designer
  (1796-1865), Swedish politician
  (1863-1944), Swedish writer and parent of Robin Fåhræus
  (1762-1789), musician
  (1803-1875), Swedish philanthropist
 Olof Fåhræus (1796–1884), Swedish politician and entomologist
  (b. 1968), Swedish sculptor
 Robin Fåhræus (1888-1968), Swedish pathologist and hematologist
  (1905-1989), Swedish gynecologist 
  (1865-1950), Swedish historian

See also
 Fåhræus effect, named for Robin Fåhræus
 Fåhræus–Lindqvist effect, also named for Robin Fåhræus
 Fahraeusia and Fahraeusiella, genera of beetles named for Olof Immanuel von Fåhraeus